The Highlands Inn is a historic hotel at the corner of 4th and Main Streets in Highlands, North Carolina.  The main block of the hotel is a three-story late Victorian structure built in 1880, with a two-story porch across the main facade.  Over the course of the 20th century a number of alterations and additions have been made to this structure, to increase services and rooms.  It is one of the oldest continuously-operating hotels in the highlands of western North Carolina.

The building was listed on the National Register of Historic Places in 1990.

See also
National Register of Historic Places listings in Macon County, North Carolina

References

External links
Highlands Inn web site

Hotel buildings on the National Register of Historic Places in North Carolina
Victorian architecture in North Carolina
Hotel buildings completed in 1880
Buildings and structures in Macon County, North Carolina
National Register of Historic Places in Macon County, North Carolina
1880 establishments in North Carolina